Rameez Junaid and Simon Stadler were the defending champions, but they did not participate that year.
Gero Kretschmer and Alexander Satschko won the title, defeating Henri Kontinen and Mateusz Kowalczyk in the final, 6–3, 6–3.

Seeds

  Colin Ebelthite /  Philipp Marx (first round)
  Andreas Siljeström /  Igor Zelenay (semifinals)
  Franko Škugor /  Goran Tošić (semifinals)
  Jonathan Eysseric /  Nicolas Renavand (quarterfinals)

Draw

Draw

External links
 Main Draw

Poznan Open - Doubles
2013 Doubles